Liam Buchanan is an Australian cricketer who represented Victoria in 2005 and 2006.

He is a brother of former Melbourne Renegades cricketer Meyrick Buchanan, and former Australian rules footballer, Amon Buchanan.

Playing career
In 2002 Buchanan was a member of the Australian Cricket Academy

Buchanan played for Melbourne Cricket Club and Geelong Cricket Club in Victorian Premier Cricket.

References

1969 births
Living people
Australian cricketers
Victoria cricketers
Cricketers from Victoria (Australia)